Gawhar Shad (meaning "joyful jewel" or "shining jewel"; alternative spelling: Gohar Shād; died 19 July 1457) was the chief consort of Shah Rukh, the emperor of the Timurid Empire.

Life
She was the daughter of Giāth ud-Din Tarkhān, an important and influential noble during Tīmur's reign. According to family traditions, the title Tarkhān was given to the family by Genghis Khan personally.

Marriage
Gawhar Shad was married to Shah Rukh probably in 1388, certainly before 1394 when their son, Ulugh Beg was born. It was a successful marriage, according to the ballads of Herat which sing of Shah Rukh's love for her. But little is known of their first forty years together, except what concerns her buildings.

Along with her brothers who were administrators at the Timurid court in Herat, Gawhar Shad played a very important role in the early Timurid history. In 1405 she moved the Timurid capital from Samarkand to Herat.

She was instrumental in the construction of Herat's Mousallah Complex.

Under her patronage, the Persian language and Persian culture were elevated to a main element of the Timurid dynasty. She and her husband led a cultural renaissance by their lavish patronage of the arts, attracting to their court artists, architects and philosophers and poets acknowledged today among the world's most illustrious, including the poet Jami. Many exquisite examples of Timurid architecture remain in Herat today.

Later years
After the death of her husband in 1447 Gawhar Shad maneuvered her favorite grandson to the throne. For ten years she became the de facto ruler of an empire stretching from the Tigris to the borders of China. When she was well past 80, she was executed on 19 July 1457 on the order of Sultān Abū Sa'īd.

According to legend, Gawhar Shad once inspected a mosque and a religious school (madrasah) in Herat accompanied by two hundred female attendants, after it had been cleared of its students, all of whom were male. One youth remained, having fallen asleep in his cell, and was discovered by an attendant and seduced. When Gawhar Shad found out, she ordered that all two hundred of her attendants be married to the students.

Burial place
Gawhar Shad's tomb is located next to the madrasah that she had built, of which the minaret remains until this day.

Legacy
A women's university in Kabul that opened in 2003 bears the name of Gawhar Shad 

Gawhar Shad had a mosque ("Masjid-e Goharshād") built in 1418 in Mashad, Khorasan. Her sister, Gowhar-Tāj also has a tomb in Khorasan.

References

History of Herat
People from Herat
Patrons of literature
1457 deaths
Year of birth unknown
15th-century women